Bharathi Shetty is an Indian politician who is the current member of the Karnataka Legislative Council. She was nominated as MLC on 22 July 2020 by the Yediyurappa Government.

References 

1960 births
Living people
Members of the Karnataka Legislative Council